The solar park "Spex" near Mérida in Spain's Extremadura provides 30 megawatts of solar power enough to supply 16,000 households. Deutsche Bank and ecoEnergías are the developers of the power plant. It was built for a cost of €250 million on a  site and uses dual axis trackers. Each panel has an area of 130 m2.

See also

Photovoltaic power stations

References

Photovoltaic power stations in Spain
Energy in Extremadura